Nikita Pustosvyat (real name Nikita Konstantinovich Dobrynin (Никита Константинович Добрынин)) (? – June 11, 1683) was one of the leaders of the Russian Old Believers during Raskol.

Life
The year of his birth is unknown. He was dubbed Pustosvyat ("hollow saint") by adherents of Patriarch Nikon. Nikita was a priest in Suzdal and participated in editing of church books under Patriarch Joseph.

In 1659, Nikita arrived to Moscow and lodged a complaint about Stefan, Archbishop of Suzdal, accusing him of digression from Orthodoxy. When Stefan was acquitted, Nikita denounced him to Tsar Aleksey Mikhaylovich.

The church council of 1666–1667 found him guilty and expelled him from the priesthood. The supporters of the old faith played an important role in the Moscow uprising of 1682, and the Old Believers gained support among the streltsy (praetorian guard). Pustosvyat achieved a July 5, 1682 church debate in the presence of the tsar. The debate, however, ended in vain for him. The streltsy betrayed Nikita, who was subsequently beheaded.

References

Further reading
 "Великая челобитная" (Субботин, Н. И. Материалы для истории раскола за первое время его существования. М., 1878, IV т.)
 Румянцев, И. Н. К. Добрынин («Пустосвят»). Сергиев Посад, 1916

Old Believer saints
Russian religious leaders
1683 deaths
17th-century Christian saints
Year of birth unknown
Place of birth unknown
Executed Russian people
17th-century executions by Russia
17th-century Russian people